James Lee Arnold (born March 24, 1974) is an American former professional baseball right-handed pitcher.

Career
Drafted by the Atlanta Braves in the first round of the 1992 Major League Baseball Draft, Arnold spent seven seasons in the Braves farm system, pitching for the Gulf Coast Braves (1992), Macon Braves (1993), Durham Bulls (1994–1995), Greenville Braves (1995–1998) and Richmond Braves (1998).

Signed as a minor league free agent by the Los Angeles Dodgers after the 1998 season,  Arnold made his Major League Baseball (MLB) debut with the Dodgers on April 20, 1999, against the Braves, working 2 scoreless innings. He pitched 36 games for the Dodgers in 1999, including 3 starts.

He failed to make the Dodgers Opening Day roster in 2000 and spent the first half of the season primarily with the Albuquerque Dukes. On July 26, 2000, the Dodgers traded him (along with Jorge Piedra to the Chicago Cubs for Ismael Valdes.  Arnold pitched in 12 games for the Cubs that season, including 4 starts.

Released after the season, he pitched in the minors for two more years, first with the Fresno Grizzlies in the San Francisco Giants system and then with the Florida Marlins Triple-A team, the Calgary Cannons. On May 25, 2002, Arnold threw the first no-hitter in Cannons' history against the Iowa Cubs.

References

External links

1974 births
Living people
Albuquerque Dukes players
American expatriate baseball players in Canada
Baseball players from Michigan
Calgary Cannons players
Chicago Cubs players
Durham Bulls players
Greenville Braves players
Gulf Coast Braves players
Fresno Grizzlies players
Iowa Cubs players
Long Island Ducks players
Los Angeles Dodgers players
Macon Braves players
Major League Baseball pitchers
Richmond Braves players
Sportspeople from Dearborn, Michigan
American expatriate baseball players in Australia